Ricardo Anaya Cortés (Spanish: [ɾiˈkaɾðo anˈaʝa koɾˈtes]; born 25 February 1979) is a Mexican lawyer and politician, and a member and former president of the centre-right National Action Party (PAN). He held the positions of Federal Deputy in the LXII Legislature of the Congress of the Union in Mexico, President of the Chamber of Deputies in Mexico and leader of the Parliamentary Group of the main opposing party in the Chamber of Deputies in Mexico.
He held the position of National President of the National Action Party until 9 December 2017, when he resigned to run in the 2018 presidential election for the PAN party in political coalition with the leftist parties Party of the Democratic Revolution (PRD) and Citizens' Movement (MC).

Since January 2019 he has been a visiting professor of politics at the School of International and Public Affairs, Columbia University.

Emilio Lozoya Austin, former head of PEMEX, accused Anaya in July 2020 of receiving a MXN $6,8 million bribe to support energy reform in 2013–2014. Anaya denied the charge and insisted he had supported privatization of PEMEX out of conviction.

Academic background

Ricardo Anaya Cortés holds a Bachelor of Law with honors from the Universidad Autónoma de Querétaro. He also has a master's degree in Tax Law from Universidad del Valle de México, from which he graduated with honors, and a Ph.D. in Political Science and Social Studies, again with honors, from Universidad Nacional Autónoma de México (UNAM). He has been a permanent lecturer in Constitutional Law and State Theory in the Law School of Universidad Autónoma de Querétaro.

Labor and party trajectory
Ricardo Anaya is a member of the National Action Party. In 2000, when he was 21 years old, he was PAN's candidate for Local Deputy in the XIV District of Querétaro, which comprised Arroyo Seco and Pinal de Amoles municipalities, and he achieved an increase of more than 400% in votes for his party in relation with the previous election. 
He was Private Secretary for the Governor of the State of Querétaro from 2003 to 2009 and he held the position of Human Development Coordinator of the Government of the State of Querétaro from 2008 to 2009.
He was a Local Deputy for the LVI Legislature of the State of Querétaro, where he held the position of Coordinator of the National Action Party's Parliamentary Group, which was the largest one.

He was President of the State Managing Committee of his party in the State of Querétaro from February 2010 to 31 March 2011, and on 1 April 2011 he was appointed Tourism Planning Undersecretary of the Ministry of Tourism of the Federal Government by the Mexican President, Felipe Calderón Hinojosa.

He was elected Federal Deputy under the proportional representation principle for the LXII Legislature, from 2012 to 2015, where he held the position of President of the Chamber of Deputies from 1 September 2013 to 5 March 2014.

On 30 September 2014, Gustavo Madero Muñoz took leave of absence from his position as PAN's president to lead the list of deputies under proportional representation of his party in the 2015 Election, and therefore, the Permanent Commission of the party appointed Ricardo Anaya Cortés who then held the position of General Secretary of the party, as National President and Fernando Álvarez Monje was appointed as the new General Secretary.

On 20 January 2015, when Madero Muñoz was plurinominal Federal Deputy candidate, he went back to leading the party and appointed Anaya Cortés as the new PAN's Parliamentary Group Coordinator in the Chamber of Deputies, while José Isabel Trejo Reyes who held the position of PAN Deputies’ Coordinator, was elected as the new General Secretary of the party.

In 2015 he was a contender for the National President position in his party, and he won with more than 80% of votes against Javier Corral Jurado.

In 2017 Ricardo Anaya Cortés met the German Chancellor Angela Merkel to discuss the international situation after Donald Trump’s election as President of the United States. Likewise, he gave a lecture at the George Washington University on the relations between Mexico and the United States, where he openly rejected Trump’s idea of building a wall on the border between both countries as "insulting and unacceptable".

Anaya was one of the candidates for President of Mexico in the general elections to be held on July 1, 2018. In polls, Anaya scored second behind Andrés Manuel López Obrador. On  July 1, 2018, Anaya came in second, losing the election to López Obrador. Anaya won the state of Guanajuato but lost every other state.

References

External links

 Official website of Ricardo Anaya Cortés

|-

1979 births
Living people
Politicians from the State of Mexico
Members of the Chamber of Deputies (Mexico)
Presidents of the Chamber of Deputies (Mexico)
National Action Party (Mexico) politicians
People from Naucalpan
Politicians from Querétaro
21st-century Mexican politicians
Candidates in the 2018 Mexican presidential election
Autonomous University of Queretaro alumni
Universidad del Valle de México alumni
National Autonomous University of Mexico alumni
Academic staff of the Autonomous University of Queretaro
Members of the Congress of Querétaro